African Warriors are a South African football club based in Phuthaditjhaba, Free State that participates in the ABC Motsepe League.

Managers
 Vladislav Heric (Dec 7, 2010—25 Oct, 2011)
 David Vilakazi (March 2014— Dec 2014)
 Johnny Mafereka (Feb 2016–

Shirt sponsor & kit manufacturer
Shirt sponsor: None
Kit manufacturer: Puma

External links
Premier Soccer League

Soccer clubs in South Africa
Association football clubs established in 2006
National First Division clubs
Soccer clubs in the Free State (province)
SAFA Second Division clubs
2006 establishments in South Africa